Picketfield Lock is a lock on the Kennet and Avon Canal, near Hungerford, Berkshire, England.

The lock has a rise/fall of 7 ft 0 in (2.13 m).

References

See also 
Locks on the Kennet and Avon Canal

Locks of Berkshire
Locks on the Kennet and Avon Canal